Killyclogher St Mary's is a Gaelic Athletic Association club based in the village of Killyclogher in County Tyrone, Northern Ireland. After many years of underage success, the club finally made the Senior Championship breakthrough in 2003. In 2016 they added another Senior Championship to their collection. They have appeared in 5 Senior County finals in the last 20 years. They currently have two Tyrone senior players: Tiernan McCann and Mark Bradley.

Notable players
 Mark Bradley
 Dermot Carlin

 Tiernan McCann

Achievements
 Tyrone Senior Football Championship (2)
 2003, 2016
 Tyrone Senior Football League (2)
 2014, 2020
 Tyrone Junior Football Championship (2)
 1905/06, 1977

References

Gaelic games clubs in County Tyrone
Gaelic football clubs in County Tyrone